Moscos Islands Wildlife Sanctuary is a protected area in the Moscos Islands, Myanmar, covering . It was established in 1927; access is only permitted to staff of the Forest Department.

References

Protected areas of Myanmar
Protected areas established in 1927